Powder Her Face, Op. 14 (1995), is a chamber opera in two acts by the British composer Thomas Adès, with an English libretto by Philip Hensher. The opera is 100 minutes long. It was commissioned by the Almeida Opera, a part of London's Almeida Theatre, for performances at the Cheltenham Music Festival.

The subject of the opera is the "Dirty Duchess", Margaret Campbell, Duchess of Argyll, whose sexual exploits were the stuff of scandal and gossip in Britain in 1963 during her divorce proceedings. The opera is explicit in its language and detail.

It was first performed on 1 July 1995 in Cheltenham, with Jill Gómez in the leading role. Reviews were generally good, but the opera became notorious for its musical depiction of fellatio: British radio station Classic FM considered it unsuitable for transmission.

The German premiere was in Magdeburg, Germany, in 1996. Irena Sylya performed the role of the Duchess.  She also performed this role in the Long Beach, CA, production in 2001

Style
The music of the sexually themed opera combines influences ranging from Alban Berg, Igor Stravinsky, and Benjamin Britten to Kurt Weill and the tangos of Ástor Piazzolla. Describing the overall impact of the libretto and the theatricality of the entire production, Alex Ross notes:

Performance history

After the premiere, there were five London performances at the Almeida Theatre.

On 8 June 2006, there was a concert performance at the Barbican Centre, London, with the London Symphony Orchestra, conducted by the composer.

From 11 to 22 June 2008, it was performed at the Linbury Studio Theatre in the Royal Opera House, London, with the Southbank Sinfonia conducted by Timothy Redmond, and Joan Rodgers as the Duchess.

The U.S. staged premiere was at the Aspen Music Festival on  25 July 1997, conducted by the composer, with Marie O'Brien as the Duchess, Heather Buck, and Allen Schrott, directed by Edward Berkeley. The same cast subsequently performed at the Brooklyn Academy of Music (BAM) on 10 December 1998 with the Brooklyn Philharmonic conducted by Robert Spano. Boston first heard the opera, as produced by Opera Boston, on 6 June 2003. The Boston Modern Opera Project was conducted by Gil Rose with Janna Baty as the Duchess; Ms. Buck and Mr. Schrott reassumed their roles.

The New York City Opera performed the opera in February 2013 at the BAM in a production by Jay Scheib and starring the soprano Allison Cook as the Duchess of Argyll. The Opera Company of Philadelphia performed the opera in June 2013, with Patricia Schuman in the lead role.

The orchestra was the Athelas Sinfonietta Copenhagen under the musical direction of Brynmor Jones with Sally Silver, Eileen Hulse, Richard Edgar-Wilson, and Martin Nelson. The Danish premiere took place later that year (2001) at Den Anden Opera with the same cast and orchestra also conducted by Brynmor Jones.

Roles and premiere cast

Synopsis

Act 1 
Scene 1 – 1990 (The hotel). An electrician and a maid are discovered by the Duchess in her suite, ridiculing her. The scene closes with the entrance of a male figure.
Scene 2 – 1934 (A country House). The Duchess's confidante and a lounge lizard discuss her recent divorce. The Duke makes an impressive entrance.
Scene 3 – 1936. The Duke and Duchess's wedding is described in a fancy aria by a waitress.
Scene 4 – 1953. The Duchess stays at the hotel and seduces a waiter. The waiter accepts a tip and reveals the recurrence of the Duchess's deeds.
Scene 5 – 1953. The Duke visits his mistress. They flirt and she suggests that the Duchess's serial seductions are the talk of London.

Act 2 
Scene 6 – 1955. Two rubberneckers comment extravagantly on the divorce case. The judge denigrates the Duchess's morals.
Scene 7 – 1970. The Duchess is interviewed by a society journalist. Her bill is delivered.
Scene 8 – 1990. The hotel manager tells the Duchess to leave the hotel, since she is unable to pay her bills. She attempts to seduce him but with no success. She departs.
Epilogue. The electrician and the maid surface from beneath the bed and destroy the hotel room.

Instrumentation
The opera is scored for an orchestra of 15 players, with much doubling, and a large range of percussion instruments.

 Clarinet 1 in B, doubling bass clarinet, soprano saxophone, and bass saxophone
 Clarinet 2 in A, doubling bass clarinet, alto saxophone, and bass saxophone
 Clarinet 3 in A, doubling bass clarinet, contrabass clarinet, and swanee whistle
 Horn in F
 Trumpet in C
 Tenor trombone
 Percussion: two tubular bells, snare drum, flat bass drum, pedal bass drum, small bongo, timbales, rototom, clash cymbals, two suspended cymbals, sizzle cymbal, hi-hat, three temple blocks, three brake drums, tambourine, triangle, tam-tam, vibraslap, washboard, cabaça, large fishing reel, whip, lion's roar, popgun, scrap metal, electric bell
 Harp, doubling electric bell and fishing reel
 Button accordion, doubling electric bell and fishing reel
 Piano, doubling fishing reel
 Violin I
 Violin II
 Viola
 Cello
 Double bass, doubling fishing reel

Film version
Powder Her Face was made into a motion picture by Britain's Channel 4 and shown on Christmas Day 1999. The film was released on DVD in the UK for Christmas 2005; the DVD includes a documentary film about Adès by Gerald Fox made at around the same time.

Recordings
Audio CD: Conducted by the composer with the Almeida Ensemble and performed by Jill Gómez, Valdine Anderson, Niall Morris, and Roger Bryson. Recorded 1998, released 1 October 1999. (EMI: CDS5566492)
DVD: Directed by David Alden, conducted by the composer with the Birmingham Contemporary Music Group and performed by Mary Plazas, Heather Buck, Daniel Norman, and Graeme Broadbent. Released in 2006 in the US (DC10002).

References

 Adès, Thomas, Powder Her Face. Score. London: Faber Music, 1995.
 Inverne, James, "A Most Auspicious Star", New York: Opera News, May 2005

External links
 "Next Wave Festival Review; Making Light Of a Duchess Given to Night Music" by Bernard Holland, The New York Times, 10 December 1998

Operas by Thomas Adès
English-language operas
Chamber operas
1995 operas
Operas
Operas set in England
Operas set in the 20th century
Operas based on real people
Cultural depictions of British women
Cultural depictions of socialites